Damani may refer to:
 a breed of goat
 Damani (sheep), found in Khyber Pakhtunkhwa province of Pakistan
 Damani, Iran, a village in Ardabil Province, Iran
 Damani (name): a surname in the Maheshwari Hindu caste, or a Gujarati surname.